Adam Ward may refer to:

 Adam Ward (baseball) (born 1986), American baseball coach and player
 Adam Ward (murder victim)  (1988–2015), photojournalist
 Adam Kelly Ward (1982–2016), American convicted murderer

See also 
 Adam v Ward, a 1919 House of Lords case